The 2017–18 LSU Tigers basketball team represented Louisiana State University during the 2017–18 NCAA Division I men's basketball season. The team's head coach was Will Wade, in his first season at LSU. They played their home games at the Pete Maravich Assembly Center in Baton Rouge, Louisiana, as a member of the Southeastern Conference. They finished the season 18–15, 8–10 in SEC play to finish in a tie for ninth place. They lost in the second round of the SEC tournament to Mississippi State. The Tigers received an invitation to the National Invitation Tournament where they defeated Louisiana before losing to Utah in the second round.

Previous season
The Tigers finished the 2016–17 season 10–21, 2–16 in SEC play to finish in a tie for 13th place. They lost in the First Round of the SEC tournament to Mississippi State.

On March 10, head coach Johnny Jones was fired. He finished at LSU with a five-year record of 90–72. On March 20, LSU hired VCU head coach Will Wade as their next head coach.

Offseason

Departures

Incoming transfers

2017 recruiting class

2018 Recruiting class

Roster

Schedule and results

|-
!colspan=12 style=|Exhibition

|-
!colspan=12 style=|Non-conference regular season

|-
!colspan=12 style=| SEC regular season

|-
!colspan=12 style=| SEC Tournament

|-
!colspan=12 style=| NIT

Source

References

LSU Tigers basketball seasons
Lsu
LSU
LSU
LSU